The United Nations Educational, Scientific and Cultural Organization (UNESCO) World Heritage Sites are places of importance to cultural or natural heritage as described in the UNESCO World Heritage Convention, established in 1972. Denmark ratified the convention on 25 July 1979, making its historical sites eligible for inclusion on the list.

The first site in Denmark to be added to the list was Jelling Mounds, Runic Stones and Church, inscribed at the 18th Session of the World Heritage Committee, held in 1994 in Phuket, Thailand. Further sites were added in 1995, 2000, 2004, 2009, 2014, 2017, and 2018. As of 2019, Denmark has ten sites inscribed on the list and a further four on the tentative list. Three sites, Kujataa, Aasivissuit – Nipisat, and Ilulissat Icefjord, are located in Greenland, which is an autonomous territory within the Kingdom of Denmark.

Seven sites in Denmark are cultural and three are natural. The natural site Wadden Sea is shared with Germany and the Netherlands. In 2014, the Danish part of the site was added to the existing site in the other two countries, listed in 2009.



World Heritage Sites 
UNESCO lists sites under ten criteria; each entry must meet at least one of the criteria. Criteria i through vi are cultural, and vii through x are natural.

Tentative list
In addition to sites inscribed on the World Heritage list, member states can maintain a list of tentative sites that they may consider for nomination. Nominations for the World Heritage list are only accepted if the site was previously listed on the tentative list. , Denmark has recorded four sites on its tentative list.

References

Denmark
Denmark geography-related lists
Lists of tourist attractions in Denmark